Besson is a French surname.

Geographical distribution
As of 2014, 82.7% of all known bearers of the surname Besson were residents of France (frequency 1:2,013), 5.5% of Switzerland (1:3,767), 3.3% of the United States (1:275,554) and 1.5% of Brazil (1:338,037).

In France, the frequency of the surname was higher than national average (1:2,013) in the following regions:
Auvergne-Rhône-Alpes (1:606)
French Guiana (1:1,016)
Bourgogne-Franche-Comté (1:1,441)
Pays de la Loire (1:1,593)
Nouvelle-Aquitaine (1:1,747)

In Switzerland, the frequency of the surname was higher than national average (1:3,767) in the following cantons:
Vaud (1:652)
Geneva (1:1,140)
Neuchâtel (1:1,369)
Valais (1:1,427)

People
Adèle Besson (fl. 1918), Frenchwoman, subject of Renoir portrait
Albert Besson (1896–1965), French physician
Antoine-Marie-Benoît Besson (1876–1969), French army general during World War II
Benno Besson (1922–2006), Swiss actor and film director
Corbyn Besson, American singer
Colette Besson (1946–2005), French athlete
Éric Besson (born 1958), French minister
Frank S. Besson Jr. (1910–1985), U.S. Army general
George Besson (1882–1971), French art critic
Gustave Auguste Besson (1820–1874), brass instrument maker
Hyacinthe Besson (1816–1861), French painter and missionary priest
Jacques Besson (1540?–1573), French inventor
Louis Besson (born 1937), French minister
Luc Besson (born 1959), film director
Philippe Besson (born 1967), French writer

See also

 Bessone (surname)

References

External links

French-language surnames
Surnames from nicknames